Newport City footbridge is a pedestrian/cycle bridge over the River Usk in the city of Newport, South Wales.

The bridge links the east bank of the river in the vicinity of Rodney Parade stadium to University Plaza on the west bank. It was the first major public project in Newport Unlimited's plans to regenerate the city.

It won a British Constructional Steelwork Association award; the 2007 George Gibby Award from the Institution of Civil Engineers in Wales; a Royal Institution of Chartered Surveyors award for regeneration in Wales, and a highly commended from Wales Business Insider for their best regeneration project of 2007.

Overview

The bridge features two A-Frame masts, which support the bridge from the west bank. The masts are positioned on a shared foundation and anchored at ground level by two  diameter cables that are connected the tips of the masts.

 Contractors: Alfred McAlpine
 Architect: Grimshaw
 Structural Engineer: Atkins
 Steel Fabricators: Rowecord Engineering

Design concept

The dramatic crane structures were designed as a deliberate and symbolic link to the site's earlier use as trading wharves—but with a modern twist. The deliberate location of the main structures on the west bank means that the vast majority of the construction work was kept away from the houses on the east bank, while avoiding impact on the local river ecology.

The foundations

The bridge foundations are supported by thirty  diameter CFA (continuous flight auger) piles varying in length. The bridge structure is suspended on five ground anchors which are drilled  into the ground.

Approximately  of concrete were used in the bridge foundations.

The masts
The masts are made from sheet steel which was rolled into 'cans'. These were then welded together to produce the tubes for the masts.

The back mast is  diameter and was delivered to site in seven sections.

The deck
The bridge deck is made up of five sections.

The deck units were installed in sequence and then welded together. Details of the deck units are shown below:

Deck one and five
  long
  wide
 weight 
Deck two and four
  long
  wide (at the outriggers)
 weight 
Deck three
  long
  wide (at the outriggers)
 weight

The cables

A half mile (800 m) of cable is used to support the bridge, varying in diameter from 2 in to 4¾ in (to 50 to 120 mm), made by Bridon Ropes of Doncaster.

Erection

The main masts for the bridge were erected in the week commencing 1 May 2006 using the largest crane in the UK.
It was officially opened on 12 September 2006 (also the centenary of Newport Transporter Bridge) and is the ninth crossing of the Usk in the city.

Facts
Maximum mast height: .
Mast weight: .
The balustrades are formed from nearly two miles (three kilometres) of stainless steel wire.
The bridge deck has 178 lights (89 on either side) fitted, providing an illuminate footpath.
The masts, mast bases and back anchor are all illuminated by 36 floodlights and up-lighters.

World record highwire walk
As part of the city's "Big Splash" festival, on 30 August 2010, 45-year-old French circus star Olivier Roustan from Toulouse, performed the highest ever wirewalk in Europe, along the top cable of the Newport City Footbridge.

See also
List of bridges in Wales

External links
Time-lapse construction photography

References

Bridges completed in 2006
Bridges in Newport, Wales
Landmarks in Newport, Wales
Pedestrian bridges in Wales
Bridges over the River Usk